This list contains the names of albums that contain a hidden track and also information on how to find them. Not all printings of an album contain the same track arrangements, so some copies of a particular album may not have the hidden track(s) listed below. Some of these tracks may be hidden in the pregap, and some hidden simply as a track following the listed tracks. The list is ordered by artist name using the surname where appropriate.

 Charlotte Gainsbourg, Rest: that album contains a hidden untitled track 30 seconds after the track “Les Oxalis”. It is a recording of Jo, Charlotte Gainsbourg’s, daughter singing the alphabet.
 Galactic:
Crazyhorse Mongoose: Untitled track hidden after a period of silence on the last track, "Quiet Please."
Late for the Future: Untitled instrumental hidden after a period of silence on the last track, "Two Clowns."
 Gallows:
 Orchestra of Wolves: A cover of the song "Staring at the Rude Bois," originally by The Ruts, can be heard after a period of silence on the final track, "Nervous Breakdown," a cover song originally by Black Flag, on the NA release and the bonus disc of the re-issued album in the UK.
 Jerry Garcia & David Grisman, Shady Grove. The album contains a hidden track at the end. It is a version of the blues classic "Hesitation Blues."
 Melody Gardot has hidden a track at the end of her third album, The Absence, called “Chegue Journeyman”, and another at the end of her first EP, Some Lessons: The Bedroom Sessions, called “Goodnite”.
 Gas, Gas 0095: "Timestretch" is a 4:30 long track shrunk to a 1-second hidden track, which in theory you can stretch back again to recover the full track. Also, unlisted tracks "Pink" and "Doom" at the end of the album.
 The Gathering:
 Black Light District: "Over You" in the album's pregap
 Souvenirs: "Telson" is hidden in the album's pregap
 Marvin Gaye, The Master: 1961/1984: Untitled track at the end of Disc 3
 Gear Daddies, Can't Have Nothin' Nice: A hidden track occurs during the last track, titled "African Killer Bees (reprise)." The song begins at the 6:42 mark.
 Generation, Brutal Reality: "Psalm 69" is an unlisted 11th track. Also it's the 69th track on some editions of the CD.
 The Gerogerigegege, Moenai Hai: Untitled track follows a minute of silence after the final track "最期の調律 / Final Tuning".
 Per Gessle, The World According to Gessle: At the end of the "Lay Down Your Arms" track, there is another version of "Kix" (Cha-cha-cha version), sung like Elvis Presley.
 G.G.F.H., Disease: Untitled hidden track begins at 12:11 after the final track.
 The Ghost Inside, Returners: The final track "Truth and Temper" is 8:50 long, with the actual song lasting until 4:23, followed by silence until 5:31, where an untitled instrumental plays until the end.
 Ghostemane, Rituals: Untitled hidden track starts at 9:02 after the final track.
 Ghostwriters: Second Skin: "Come clean" as unlisted track number 99; tracks 13 to 98 are untitled, each consisting merely of four seconds of silence
 Michael Giacchino, Inside Out: Original Soundtrack: After "The Joy of Credits", a hidden track called "TripleDent Gum Jingle" was played.
 Girlyman, Joyful Sign: After the last listed song ("Right Here") finishes, a final 45-second track plays that features background singing and talking from the earlier track during the recording of "Through to Sunrise" without the accompanying music.
 Glass Animals, ZABA: After the song JDNT finishes there is a noticeable pause and another song begins. The song is called "Psylla" and it does not show up on the record sleeve, lyric sheet, or record label. 
 Glassjaw, Everything You Ever Wanted to Know About Silence: "Losten" at the end of the album
 Gnarls Barkley, The Odd Couple: "Crazy" at 33 BPM at the end of the album
 Godflesh, Hymns: Untitled track follows a minute of silence after the final listed track, "Jesu."
 Godsmack, Godsmack: Untitled track beginning at 6:39 into the final track, "Voodoo." Also referred to as "Witch Hunt".
 Godspeed You! Black Emperor:
 F♯ A♯ ∞: "J.L.H. Outro" begins 24:54 into the final track, "Providence."
 Yanqui U.X.O.: "George Bush Cut Up While Talking" appears at the end of vinyl editions of the album.
 Gojira: The Way of All Flesh 2008 at 12:33 on the song "The Way of All Flesh" the untitled instrumental track plays, after 5:42 of silence, until the end of the album Terra Incognita 2001 at 5:30 on the song "In The Forest" untitled instrumental track plays until about 10 seconds from the end of the album, played in live under the name Terra Incognita.
 Jean-Jacques Goldman, Chanson pour les pieds: "La vie c'est mieux quand on est amoureux" at the end of the album.
 Good Charlotte:
 The Chronicles of Life and Death: "Wounded" at the end of the album.
 Good Charlotte: "Thank You Mom" at the end of the album.
 Matthew Good, White Light Rock & Roll Review: "Hopeless" after a minute of silence at the end of "Ex-Pats of the Blue Mountain Symphony Orchestra".
 Matthew Good Band, Last of the Ghetto Astronauts: "Omissions of the Omen" after a period of silence at the end of "The War Is Over".
 Gorgoroth, Destroyer: Track 8 is a cover of Darkthrone. It is not mentioned on the tracklist on the back cover, but it is mentioned on the tracklist in the booklet.
 Gorillaz:
 Gorillaz: The Ed Case remix of "Clint Eastwood" comes after the last song on the album ("M1A1" or "Left Hand Suzuki Method," depending on what region the album was purchased from)
 Demon Days: "Bill Murray," only on copies from Japan
 Laika Come Home: There is track 12, "M1 A1," and it gets followed by hidden tracks, varieing from where it is bought. On the vinyl and limited edition CD versions: "Strictly Rubbadub (Version)" and "A Fistful Of Peanuts (Version)." Standard US CD contains "Strictly Rubbadub (Version)" as a hidden track.
 Goldie, Saturnzreturn: "The Dream Within" begins six minutes and sixteen seconds into the song "Truth," after several moments of silence.
 Goldie Lookin Chain, Safe as Fuck: "Bedsit" is located 4:09 before the first track.
 Goldfinger: On the album Hang-Ups, the song "Chris Cayton" has 2 hidden tracks, in between great periods of silence.
 Delta Goodrem, Mistaken Identity: "Nobody Listened" at the end of the Australian version of the album
 Grand Buffet, Cigarette Beach: There is short untitled track, which begins after several minutes of silence from "Thus Ends the Beach"
 Grandaddy
 Sumday: An untitled instrumental begins immediately after "The Go in the Go-for-It"; the same music plays in the background of the intro to "Saddest Vacant Lot in All the World" later in the album.
 Just Like the Fambly Cat: Immediately following the last track "This is How it Always Starts," there is an unacknowledged cover of ELO's "Shangri-La."
 Amy Grant, A Christmas to Remember: last track is "Agnus Dei", but exclusive to copies sold at Target stores, after a brief silence is a cover of the Carpenters classic, "Merry Christmas, Darling"
 Grateful Dead, Dick's Picks Volume 13: Disc 2; last track is Saint of Circumstance, then after a long silence, the hidden Scarlet>Fire begins
 David Gray, White Ladder: "Through to Myself" when "Please Forgive Me" is rewound to negative time.
 Great Big Sea, Play: An untitled track at the end of the album, often referred to as "Little Beggarman" or "Rigadoon"
 Greazy Meal: Visualize World Greaze: A cover of "Funkytown" precedes the opening track.
 Green Day, Dookie: "All By Myself" appears after final track "F.O.D.." The song is performed by drummer Tre Cool, who sings and plays acoustic guitar, and was recorded at a party.
 Green Lizard: Identity: "Why bother" follows the last track "No One Knew" after 8.30 minutes.
 Green Velvet: Green Velvet: The track "Help Me" occurs in the middle of track 12.
 Grey Daze:
 Wake Me: After the final track, an a cappella version of "Morei Sky" starts after 2 minutes of silence.
 ...No Sun Today: The unlisted track is an acoustic version of "The Down Syndrome" on track 13. Even though the hidden track is 5:23 long, the song actually starts at the 1:24 mark.
 Grey Eye Glances:
 Painted Pictures: "Close of the Day" at the end of the album
 Songs of Leaving: "Your Move" following on from final track
 The Grid, Evolver: A telephone answering message at the end of the album
 Guns N' Roses, "The Spaghetti Incident?": "Look at Your Game, Girl," originally performed by Charles Manson, at the end of the album.
 Gus Gus, Polydistortion: "Polybackwards"
 Guster, Keep It Together: "Two at a Time" after a 30-second silent track at the end of the album
 A Guy Called Gerald, Black Secret Technology: Untitled track 14 with vocalist David Simpson after the end of the final track "Life Unfolds His Mystery."
 GWAR: Carnival of Chaos: "Drop Drawers": an incredibly short version of the 8 Minute long epic found on their incredibly rare 'Rare Trax' album.
 Gym Class Heroes, The Papercut Chronicles: A computer generated voice talks at the end of "Band AIDS."

See also
 List of backmasked messages
 List of albums with tracks hidden in the pregap

References 

G